Naoda Assembly constituency is an assembly constituency in Murshidabad district in the Indian state of West Bengal.

Overview
As per orders of the Delimitation Commission, No. 74 Naoda Assembly constituency covers Naoda community development block and Chaitannapur I, Chaitannapur II, Madda and Mahula II gram panchayats of Beldanga I community development block.

Naoda Assembly constituency is part of No. 10 Baharampur (Lok Sabha constituency).

Members of Legislative Assembly

Election results

2019-present

2011-2019
In the 2011 election, Abu Taher Khan of Congress defeated his nearest rival Jayanta Biswas of RSP.

In 2016, he had won in the election and continued his work as M.L.A. In 2019, he stands in Lok Sabha election from Murshidabad constituency from AITC.

1977–2006
In the 2006 and 2001 state assembly elections Abu Taher Khan of Congress won the Naoda assembly seat defeating his nearest rival Jayanta Kumar Biswas of RSP. Contests in most years were multi cornered but only winners and runners are being mentioned. Jayanta Kumar Biswas of RSP defeated Nasiruddin Khan of Congress in 1996. Nasiruddin Khan of Congress defeated Jayanta Kumar Biswas of RSP in 1991. Jayanta Kumar Biswas of RSP defeated Harun Ali Rashid of Congress in 1987, and Nasiruddin Khan of Congress in 1982 and 1977.

1951–1972
Nasiruddin Khan, representing IUML in 1972, Independent in 1971, and Progressive Muslim League in 1969, won the Naoda seat. Mohammad Israil of Congress won in 1967,1962,1957 and in independent India's first election in 1951.

References

Assembly constituencies of West Bengal
Politics of Murshidabad district